La Faena Films is a film production company founded in 2015, by the Venezuelan filmmakers Jorge Thielen Armand and Rodrigo Michelangeli. It operates both in Toronto and Caracas.

Their film projects have mainly consisted in international co-productions, with alliances between countries, and have been exhibited and awarded in film festivals worldwide. They have produced three feature films (La Fortaleza, La Soledad and El Father Plays Himself) and three short films (Of Memory and Debris, Flor de la Mar and Ráfagas de Paz).

About their projects 
La Fortaleza, the second feature film of Thielen Armand, is a co-production between Venezuela, Colombia, France and The Netherlands. The movie was screened with positive reviews in the Tiger Competition of the 49º International Film Festival Rotterdam. It is the first Venezuelan production to compete in this festival. La Fortaleza was also screened in the Busan, Gijon, Cairo, Rome and Biarritz festivals. In the latter, the critic and film historian Nicole Brenez awarded the film with the Jury Prize. It was also awarded in Rome and Caracas.

Thielen Armand’s debut film, La Soledad, premiered in the 73º Venice International Film Festival and was screened in over 60 festivals around the world. It received 14 awards, amongst them the Miami Film Festival’s Audience Award.

Additionally, Of Memory and Debris, a 2020 short film directed by Rodrigo Michelangeli, received the Special Mention at the Caracas Film Critics Festival in Venezuela and released online as a Vimeo Staff Pick.

The directors of La Faena Films are committed to a cinema that questions reality through an auteur gaze, with special interest in the Venezuelan contemporary identity.

Filmography

References

External links 

 Official website
 La Faena Films at IMDb.

Film production companies of Canada
Film production companies of Venezuela